Pat Sanders (born c. 1954 in Neepawa, Manitoba) is a Canadian curler and world champion from Victoria, British Columbia.

Championships
Sanders became world champion in 1987 with the Canadian team.

Her team won the 1987 Scott Tournament of Hearts, and reached the final in 1988, finishing second.

In 2008, Sanders won the Canadian Senior Curling Championships, and won a gold medal for Canada at the 2009 World Senior Curling Championships.

She won the Canadian Seniors again in 2010 and another gold medal at the World Seniors in 2011.

She was inducted into the Canadian Curling Hall of Fame in 2012.

Sanders won the Canadian Masters Curling Championships in 2018, skipping team British Columbia.

References

External links
 

1950s births
Living people
Canadian women curlers
World curling champions
Canadian mixed curling champions
Curlers from British Columbia
Curlers from Manitoba
Canadian women's curling champions
Sportspeople from Victoria, British Columbia